The Twelve Auspicious Rites (and ) are a series of worldly rites of passage recognized in traditional Burmese culture, particularly by the Bamar. These are distinct from the Thirty-eight Buddhist Beatitudes described in the Maṅgala Sutta.

In modern times, only four or five of these rites — the naming, first feeding, ear-boring, shinbyu, and wedding rites — are commonly practiced in Myanmar, especially in urban cities. In pre-colonial Burma, Brahmins typically consecrated or led these rites. Today, masters of ceremony who specialize in abhisheka rituals, called beiktheik saya (ဘိသိက်ဆရာ), consecrate these rites. Beiktheik saya derive their skills from four Vedic scriptures, namely Sāmaveda, Yajurveda, Atharvaveda, and Rigveda, in addition to Pali scriptures.

List of rites 

  – the successful delivery of a child
  – the taking of refuge in the Three Jewels, worship of the Nandimukha nat, and paying of obeisance to a child's grandparents on the third day of a child's birth
  – the shaving of a child's hair on the 7th day of a child's birth
  – the first cradling of a child on an auspicious day
  – the first ceremonial feeding of betel nut (flavored with catechu, licorice, and fennel seeds) to a child, on the 75th or 100th day of a child's birth
  – the first revealing of a child to the sun and moon on the full moon day of the first, second, or third Burmese lunar months following a child's birth
  – the naming of a child based on a child's personalized horoscope (ဇာတာ) on the 100th day of a child's birth, similar to the Hindu namakarana ceremony
  – the first ceremonial feeding of solid food (steamed rice) to a child, also commemorated with the donation of food alms to Buddhist monks, on the 6th month of a child's birth
  – the hair-knotting of a child, after the hair is shampooed with traditional herbal shampoo made with soap acacia and Grewia elastica (Tayaw kinbun) on an auspicious day
  – the ear-boring ceremony of a child an auspicious day
  – shinbyu, the ordination of a child into the Buddhist monkhood as a samanera on an auspicious day
  – the wedding ceremony on an auspicious day

The scholar Aung Chein also identifies a number of auspicious rites outside of the twelve listed above:

  – the first touching of the ground by a child
  – the first parting of the child's hair by his or her mother
  – the wearing of the makuṭa crown
 – the housewarming ceremony

See also 

 Awgatha
 Buddhābhiṣeka
 Culture of Myanmar
 Mingalaba
 Shinbyu
 Weddings in Myanmar

Notes

References 

Burmese culture
Rites of passage